The saddled bichir, Polypterus endlicheri endlicheri, is a prototypical subspecies of the Polypterus genus, meaning most of its features are held across the genus.

Appearance
The body is long and about as deep as it is wide.  A serrated dorsal fin runs along most of the body until it meets the caudal fin.  The pectoral fins attach just behind and below the gill openings and are the primary means of locomotion, providing a slow, graceful appearance. The pattern of the fish consists of irregular vertical bands along the flanks of the fish, that do not extend completely onto the ventral surface. They are normally a whitish-yellow colour, but are available in an albino and platinum colour morph.
In the wild colour morph black spots are seen on and around the head, body and caudal fin. 
This is 'lower jaw' polypterus, and thus has a prominent lower jaw longer than the upper jaw.

P. endlicheri endlicheri is one of the larger Polypterus species attaining a record maximum size of 30".

The head is small and lizard-like with a large gaping mouth and small eyes on either side.  Since its eyesight is poor the bichir primarily hunts by smell.  External nostrils protrude from the nose of the fish to enable this.

The fish has a pair of primitive lungs instead of a swim bladder, allowing it to periodically gulp air from the surface of the water. In the aquarium bichirs can be observed dashing to the surface for this purpose. Provided the skin remains moist, the creature can remain out of the water for near indefinite periods of time.

Subspecies
There is one subspecies of endlicheri, which tends to grow much larger (39") than P. endlicher endlicheri, and this is Polypterus endlicheri congicus

See also
List of freshwater aquarium fish species

References

 

Polypteridae
Fish described in 1847